Conus skoglundae is a species of sea snail, a marine gastropod mollusc in the family Conidae, the cone snails and their allies.

Like all species within the genus Conus, these snails are predatory and venomous. They are capable of "stinging" humans, therefore live ones should be handled carefully or not at all.

Description
The size of the shell attains 25 mm.

Distribution
This marine species occurs off Baja California, Mexico

References

 Tenorio, Tucker & Chaney, 2012, A Conchological Iconography, XVIII: The Families Conilithidae and Conidae - The Conus of the East Pacific; ConchBooks, 
  Puillandre N., Duda T.F., Meyer C., Olivera B.M. & Bouchet P. (2015). One, four or 100 genera? A new classification of the cone snails. Journal of Molluscan Studies. 81: 1-23

External links
 To World Register of Marine Species

skoglundae
Gastropods described in 2012